Natao Township is a rural township in Bama Yao Autonomous County, Guangxi Zhuang Autonomous Region, China.

Administrative division
As of 2017, the township is divided into eight villages: 
 Natao
 Namin
 Lanting
 Lide
 Poliang
 Min'an
 Banjiao
 Pinglin

Geography
The township is bordered to the north by Bama Town, to the east by Dahua Yao Autonomous County, to the southeast by Bailin Township, to the southwest by Tiandong County, and to the west by Yandong Township.

The Lingqi River flows through the town west to east.  The Laiqing River flows through the town north to south.

Demographics

The population of Bama, according to the 2018 census, is 30,371.

Economy
The town's economy is based on nearby mineral resources and agricultural resources. Medicinal materials, bamboo shoots, ginger, anise, tea oil, bananas, Bama miniature pig and ducks are well-known local products.

The region abounds with titanium, silicon, copper, iron, manganese, gold, talc and mineral water.

Transport
The Provincial Highway S208 passes across the township.

References

Bibliography
 

Townships of Hechi
Divisions of Bama Yao Autonomous County